Valencian Socialist Action (in Valencian: Acció Socialista Valencià) was a political party in Valencia, Spain. It existed informally between 1962 and 1964, during the Francoist State, which had banned all the political organizations other than those in the Movimiento Nacional.

History
The party was founded by ex-members of the Social Christian Movement of Catalonia, including Eliseu Climent i Corberà, Joan Francesc Mira i Casterà, Rosa Raga and Vicent Àlvarez i Rubio. The party was heavily influenced by the ideas of Joan Fuster, and defended the Catalan Countries. Its members joined the Valencian Socialist Party in late 1964.

See also
 Socialist Party of the Valencian Country
 Valencian Socialist Party
 Valencian nationalism
 Pancatalanism

References

 Benito Sanz Díaz and Miquel Nadal i Tàrrega: Tradició i modernitat en el valencianisme. València, Edicions Tres i Quatre, 1996

Political parties in the Valencian Community
Socialist parties in Spain
Political parties established in 1962
Political parties disestablished in 1968
Anti-Francoism